Antonio Janigro (21 January 19181 May 1989) was an Italian cellist and conductor.

Biography 
Born in Milan, he began studying piano when he was six and cello when he was eight. Initially taught by Giovanni Berti, Janigro enrolled in the Verdi Conservatory of Milan, where he was instructed by Gilberto Crepax. By 1934 Janigro was studying under Diran Alexanian and Pablo Casals at the École Normale in Paris. He graduated from the school in 1934 and began performing solo and in recitals with Dinu Lipatti, Paul Badura-Skoda and Alfredo Rossi.

An unfortunately timed vacation in Yugoslavia left Janigro stranded in that country for the duration of World War II. He became a professor of cello and chamber music at the Zagreb Conservatory, where his influence developed modern cello playing in Yugoslavia. He also performed as part of the Maček-Šulek-Janigro Trio. At war's end Janigro travelled throughout South America and the Far East as a soloist. In 1949, he started his career as a conductor. In 1959, he was Fritz Reiner's soloist, along with Milton Preves and John Weicher, in a renowned Chicago Symphony Orchestra recording of Strauss's Don Quixote.

An extraordinarily gifted teacher, Janigro educated many cellists around the world. Most of them studied at the Staatliche Hochschule für Musik und Darstellende Kunst Stuttgart and the Mozarteum Salzburg.  Among his students were Julius Berger, Mario Brunello, Thomas Demenga, Michael Flaksman , Michael Groß, Antonio Meneses, Andrej Petrac, Mario de Secondi, Giovanni Sollima, Gustavo Tavares, Enrico Dindo and Christoph Theinert.

Janigro was a highly regarded conductor who led a symphony orchestra for Radio Zagreb and guest-conducted throughout Europe. The chamber orchestra I Solisti di Zagreb was created by Janigro and Dragutin Hrdjok in 1954 and was led by Janigro until he left the ensemble in 1968.

Recordings
Vivaldi: Concertos for Diverse Instruments. I Solisti di Zagreb, Antonio Janigro -conductor. The Bach Guild, Vanguard Records Stereolab LP, BG/BGS-70665, 1960s.
J. S. Bach: The 6 Cello Suites (1954, Westminster/Doremi DHR-8014~5)
J. S. Bach: The 3 Sonatas for Cello and Harpsichord, Robert Veyron-Lacroix(harpsichord) (1954, Westminster/Doremi DHR-8014~5)
Boccherini: Cello Concerto in B flat major, Prague Symphony Orchestra conducted by Milan Horvat (1948, Westminster/Doremi DHR-8016)
Antonín Dvořák: Cello Concerto in B minor, Janigro – soloist, Vienna State Opera Orchestra conducted by Dean Dixon, (Westminster/ABC Records W-9716)
Ludwig Beethoven: Cello Sonatas (Complete),[With Carlo Zecchi, Piano] Westminster XWN-2218

References

Sources 
Dedication site
Biography at Antonio Janigro Association Zagreb

External links
Antonio Janigro Association Zagreb

1918 births
1989 deaths
Italian classical cellists
Italian male conductors (music)
Musicians from Milan
Mozarteum University Salzburg alumni
20th-century Italian conductors (music)
State University of Music and Performing Arts Stuttgart alumni
Italian expatriates in Germany
Italian expatriates in Austria
20th-century Italian male musicians
20th-century cellists